The following is a list of Allied ships sunk, wrecked or captured at sea by surface vessels of the Regia Marina during the battle of the Mediterranean. The list includes vessels lost to the combined action of surface warships and airpower.

List of ships

Cruisers

Destroyers

Motor Torpedo Boats

Merchant ships

Submarines

Minor landing craft

Ships sunk by manned torpedoes from Olterra

Footnotes

References

Regia Marina
Maritime incidents in 1940
Maritime incidents in 1941
Maritime incidents in 1942
Maritime incidents in 1943
International maritime incidents
Lists of World War II ships
Battle of the Mediterranean
World War II shipwrecks in the Mediterranean Sea
World War II Allied ships